Queen Heonjeong of the Hwangju Hwangbo clan (960/5–993) or formally called as Grand Queen Mother Hyosuk during her son's reign, was a Goryeo royal family member as the third daughter (formally youngest) of Wang Uk and youngest sister of King Seongjong who became the fourth wife of her half first cousin, King Gyeongjong. After his death, she had an affair with her half uncle which they eventually became the biological parent of King Hyeonjong. From this marriage, Queen Heonjeong became the fourth reigned Goryeo queen who followed her maternal clan after Queen Heonae, her elder sister.

Not much records left about her early life beside that she and her siblings were raised by their paternal grandmother since child.

Affair matter with Wang Uk
After King Gyeongjong's death, she became a widowed on her mid-twenties and out the palace, lived in her own mansion in Gaegyeong which close to her half uncle, Wang Uk's house in southern Wangnyun Temple (왕륜사, 王輪寺), Songak Mountain, so they were a neighborhood.

Someday, it was said that she had a dream that, she climbed a hill and urinated, overflowing the country and turning into a sea of silver. She then visited a shaman to interpret her dream and the shaman predicted that if she gave birth to a son, her son would become the King of the Nation and she'll occupy the country. The Queen said: "I am already a widow, how can I have a son?." while rebuked that shaman.

Since the widowed queen wasn't allowed to approach other men by law, so she often visited her uncle as just him on his 50s was her only conversation partner and as they spend times together, they then became close each other and after 10 years passed, the Queen thought that her heart, which had moved little by little, just relayed on Wang Uk. On a night in 991, after prayed for her late husband's happiness in Wangnyun Temple, both Uk and the Queen confirmed each other's feelings and the two slowly began to embrace their love affair. As a result, they eventually had a son named Wang Sun.

At this time, peoples around them were all quiet and the courts was unaware of this. Knowing her deed, the Queen who felt her fetus was anxious and her body must only serve the late King and couldn't even have a relationship with another man, she was said want to die as she even had a child with her own uncle. Seeing this, her older sister, Queen Mother Heonae was openly communicated her affection with Gim Chi-yang, but her weak-hearted younger sister trembled with the queen mother's anxiety and she then cried while hugged Uk. In her uncle's hugged, she said:
"How do i do this?, i'd rather die. It's all my fault. I should have kept only your heart. What do I do now that I have a child?, don't worry too much and take good care of yourself, I'll cover all your mistakes. I'm going to hurt my body like this."

In 992, while she stayed in his house, his slave piled up firewood in the yard and set it on fire. As soon as the flames started to rise, an official ran to put the fire out, King Seongjong rushed to rescue them and hurriedly came with asked for Uk's affairs and condolences. During this time, it was said that she ashamed and despised, then cried a lot in shame and went back to her own mansion, but as soon as she reached the gate, there was a fetal movement. She was said to trembling with anxiety until the day she gave birth in her late-twenties and turned her back on her world, leaving Uk and their only son. Seongjong, who wanted to comforted his younger sister, said:
"Your uncle has disturbed the morals of the Royal Family. Don't think too badly about sending him to Sasu-hyeon to correct the country's discipline."
Uk, who had no choice, cried as he embraced his lover who was getting colder and later died during the childbirth.

Not long after this, after the whole nation know that the widowed Queen got pregnant, Uk was exiled to Sasu-hyeon (nowadays is Sacheon-si, Gyeongsangnam-do, South Korea) due to his affair. As Wang Sun still young at this time, so he was bought to the palace by his uncle and gave Sun a nanny to take care of him. Sun's maternal aunt, the queen mother who now became a regent for her son, King Mokjong, threatened Sun's life after his mother's death and had a tumultuous time until the day he ascended the throne.

In 1009, Mokjong was deposed and his mother was expelled due to Gang Jo's rebellion in Ganghwa Island. Wang Sun then ascended the throne from Ganghwa's insistence. As his mother, the late queen was then honoured as a Queen Mother and received her Posthumous name. Along with Uk, they were buried in the Wolleung Tomb (원릉, 元陵).

Posthumous name
In May 1017 (8th year reign of King Hyeonjong), name Hye-sun (혜순, 惠順) was added.
In June 1021 (12nd year reign of King Hyeonjong), name In-hye (인혜, 仁惠) was added.
In April 1027 (18th year reign of King Hyeonjong), name Seon-yong (선용, 宣容) was added.
In October 1253 (40th year reign of King Gojong), name Myeong-gan (명간, 明簡) was added to her Posthumous name too.

In popular culture
Portrayed by Park Eun-bin and Shin Ae in the 2009 KBS2 TV series Empress Cheonchu.
Portrayed by Kim Do-hye in the 2016 SBS TV series Moon Lovers: Scarlet Heart Ryeo.

References

External links 
 http://www.guide2womenleaders.com/korea_heads.htm
 Queen Heonjeong 
 태몽으로 사랑을 얻고 왕자를 낳은 헌정왕후  
 안종 욱과 헌정왕후의 슬픈 사랑 남해타임스 
 헌애·헌정 자매의 싸움… 고려 王씨 왕조가 김씨 왕조가 될 뻔 조선일보 2009.09.19 
Queen Heonjeong on Encykorea .
헌정왕후 on Doosan Encyclopedia .

10th-century Korean women
Royal consorts of the Goryeo Dynasty
960s births
993 deaths
10th-century Korean people
Remarried royal consorts
People from Kaesong